Ştefan Iovan (born 23 August 1960) is a Romanian former football player and manager. Iovan played for several clubs, most notably Steaua București, and represented Romania 34 times between 1983 and 1990.

Club career
Iovan made his debut at CSM Reşiţa in 1977, before joining the squad of Luceafărul București one year later. Luceafărul was then a team formed by the Romanian Football Federation to gather the young talents of Romanian football and did not play in any league. Iovan returned to Reşiţa in 1979, but in the winter of 1981 joined Steaua București where he played for ten years, until 1991.

In 1991 he joined the English club Brighton & Hove Albion, but returned to Steaua București in 1992 for half a season only before signing with Rapid Bucharest, then Electroputere Craiova in 1995. His last season as a professional football player was 1996–97 with CSM Reşiţa.

Iovan played a total of 373 games in Divizia A and scored 20 goals. He was champion of Divizia A on six occasions and also won the Romanian Cup three times, all with Steaua Bucharest.

He was the team captain of Steaua when they won the 1986 European Cup and the UEFA Super Cup.

On 25 March 2008 he was decorated by the president of Romania, Traian Băsescu with Ordinul "Meritul Sportiv" — (The Order "The Sportive Merit") class II for his part in winning the 1986 European Cup Final.

International career
At the international level, he played for Romania in 34 games and scored three goals. He also played 12 times for the Romanian Under 21 side.

Coaching career
After retiring from football he was assistant coach at Steaua București, leading the team once as head coach. He is currently the assistant manager of Steaua București.

Honours
Steaua București
Romanian League: 1984–85, 1985–86, 1986–87, 1987–88, 1988–89, 1992–93
Romanian Cup: 1984–85, 1986–87, 1988–89
European Cup: 1985–86
UEFA Super Cup: 1986

Brighton & Hove Albion
Sussex Senior Cup 1991-92

References

External links

 

1960 births
Living people
Romanian footballers
Romanian expatriate footballers
Romania international footballers
Liga I players
Liga II players
CSM Reșița players
FC Steaua București players
FC Rapid București players
Brighton & Hove Albion F.C. players
English Football League players
Expatriate footballers in England
FC Steaua București assistant managers
CSA Steaua București managers
Association football defenders
Romanian football managers
Romanian expatriate sportspeople in England
Association football coaches